In Hindu Religion, the Brahmastra (IAST: Brahmāstra) is an astra (projectile weapon) that is said to be able to destroy the whole universe, capable of destroying creation and vanquishing all beings. Only Parasurama, Rama, Meghnada, Bhisma, Drona, Karna, Ashwatthama, and Arjuna possessed the knowledge to invoke this weapon. It is one of the most destructive, powerful, and irresistible weapons mentioned in Hinduism. It was created by Lord Brahma along with its more powerful variants Brahmashirā astra, Brahmanda astra and Bhargavastra.

It is termed as a fiery weapon that creates a fierce fireball, blazing up with terrible flames and countless horrendous thunder flashes. When discharged, all nature including trees, oceans, and animals tremble, and the sky surrounds with flame, glaciers melt and mountains shatter with copious noise all around.

When used, the Brahmastra which is person-centric can destroy a powerful enemy if he does not possess an alternate counter weapon. If it is Brahmashirā astra, it causes collateral damage to every useful resource in a given area and prevents even a single blade of grass from ever growing in that area again. It is mentioned in Epic that there will be no rainfall for 12 Brahma years (12 Brahma years = 37.32 trillion human years) and climate conditions will worsen. The strike of the Brahmashirā astra will eventually destroy everything.

When Ashwatthama hurled the Brahmashirā astra against Arjuna, the Pandava countered by invoking the same weapon; to prevent widespread destruction Narada and Vyasa stood between the two astras, ordering the two warriors to withdraw their weapons. (Arjuna, out of nobility, did so; Ashwatthama, however, out of anger refused to recall the astra and rather directed it to Uttarā's womb to kill the unborn Parikshita in an attempt to produce some level of damage to his opponents but Krishna intervened and saved the child and Ashwatthama was made to surrender the gem on his forehead and cursed by Krishna for 3000 years that he will roam in the forests with blood and puss oozing out of his injuries and cry for death but death would not meet him.)

The origin of the word comes from the word Brahma, who is the "Creator" in Hindu culture. The idea that Brahmastra is the most powerful weapon can be understood by the kind of weapons that were used according to Hindu culture. The Trimurti, which consists of the three main Gods, Brahma, Vishnu and Shiva, each wielding an astra, have them according to their characteristics.

Variants

Brahmashirā Astra 

The Brahmashirā Astra or Brahmashirsha astra  (Brahma's 4 head weapon), manifests with four heads of Brahma at the front and is four times stronger than the normal Brahmastra. Arjuna, Drona, Karna, Ashwatthama and Bhishma were the among who possessed this knowledge in Mahabharata.

Brahma Danda 
The Brahma Danda (Brahma's rod) or also known as Brahmanda,  is a weapon of self-defence, created by Brahma. It is only to be possessed by Brahmanas and its powers are dependent on its owner. The weapon is a rod capable of absorbing any incoming attack towards its owner. When Vishwamitra, in a fit of anger, unleashed the Brahmastra onto Vasishtha, it was his Brahmanda that protected him from the lethal weapon.

Uses
There are numerous instances within Sanskrit theological scriptures where the Brahmastra is used or its use is threatened, including:

Maharaja Kaushika (who later became Brahmarshi Vishvamitra) used it against Maharishi Vasishta, but the Brahmastra was swallowed by Vasishta's Brahmadanda Astra.
Indrajit used the Nagpasha against the army of Rama in the Ramayana. Lakshmana was injured by this weapon only. Only the Sanjeevani herbs brought by Hanuman managed to save the brothers and their army from death. Also, Indrajit used the Brahmastra against Hanuman, but Hanuman survived because of the boon previously given to him by Lord Brahma.
In the Ramayana, a Brahmastra is used by Shri Rama several times: once against Jayanta when he hurt Sita, against Mareecha in their last encounter, and finally the Brahmastra was used in the last battle with the Asura emperor Ravana. According to the Ramayana, the weapon was also aimed at Samudra (the sea god) to carve a path out of the sea such that Rama's army could march towards the island of Lanka. However, as Rama loaded the weapon, Samudra appeared and offered to assist the king in crossing the ocean. But once invoked, the Brahmastra must be discharged, and hence it was instead aimed towards Dhrumatulya, falling at of modern-day Rajasthan, causing it to become a desert for eons to come. This incident is mentioned in Yuddha Kanda 22 Sarga, Verse 31.

See also

Indian epic poetry
Ramayana
Mahabharata
Puranas
Brahma
Brahmani
Vyūha

References

Weapons in Hindu mythology